The Mallee black-backed snake (Suta nigriceps), also known commonly as the black-backed snake, the copper snake, and Mitchell's short-tailed snake, is a species of venomous snake in the family Elapidae. The species is endemic to Australia.

Geographic range
S. nigriceps is found in the Australian states of New South Wales, South Australia, Victoria, and Western Australia.

Habitat
The preferred natural habitats of S. nigriceps are forest, savanna, and shrubland.

Description
The top of the head and the nape of the neck are grayish black, and the upper labials are whitish. There is a vertebral stripe or zone, about five scale rows wide, which is also grayish black. The lateral dorsal scales are reddish brown or purplish brown. The venter is whitish.

Reproduction
S. nigriceps is viviparous.

References

Further reading
Coventry AJ (1971). "Identification of the Black-headed Snakes (Denisonia) within Victoria". The Victorian Naturalist 88: 304–306. (Denisonia brevicauda, p. 306 + Figure 1D on p. 305).
Günther A (1863). "Third Account of new Species of Snakes in Collection of the British Museum". Annals and Magazine of Natural History, Third Series 12: 348–365. (Hoplocephalus nigriceps, new species, p. 362).
Hutchinson MN (1990). "The generic classification of the Australian terrestrial elapid snakes". Memoirs of the Queensland Museum 29 (3): 397–405. (Suta nigriceps).
Mengden GA (1983). "The Taxonomy of Australian Elapid Snakes: A Review". Records of the Australian Museum 35 (5): 195–222. (Unechis nigriceps, new combination, pp. 216, 218).
Mitchell FJ (1951). "The South Australian Reptile Fauna. Part 1. Ophidia". Records of the South Australian Museum 9: 545–557. (Denisonia nigrostriata brevicauda, new subspecies, pp. 550–551).

Snakes of Australia
Suta
Reptiles described in 1863
Taxa named by Albert Günther
Taxobox binomials not recognized by IUCN